Rottmann is a German surname. Notable people with the surname include:

 Carl Rottmann (1797–1850), German landscape painter
 Manuela Rottmann (born 1972), German politician
 Nicole Rottmann (born 1989), Austrian tennis player
 Wolfgang Rottmann (born 1973), Austrian biathlete

See also 
 5197 Rottmann, main-belt asteroid

German-language surnames